Gypsy music may refer to:

Gypsy music, also known as Gypsy style, Romani-related music played in a characteristic gypsy style and Romani music, the original music of the Romani people
Gypsy jazz, jazz played by Romani people
Gypsy punk, a hybrid of Romani music and punk rock
Gypsy scale, a musical scale sometimes found in Romani music